Wilding may refer to:

People
Alexa Wilding (c. 1845–48 – 1884), D.G. Rossetti's model 
Alison Wilding (born 1948)
Anthony Wilding, New Zealand world tennis champion
Barbara Wilding
Cora Wilding, New Zealand physiotherapist and artist
Craig Wilding (born 1981), English professional footballer
Dorothy Wilding (1893–1976)
Faith Wilding (born 1943)
Mark Wilding
George Wilding
Michael Wilding (actor) (1912–1979)
Michael Wilding (writer) (born 1942)
Peter Wilding (born 1968)
Rav Wilding (born 1977)
Richard Wilding (born 1965), British academic
Tony Wilding

Characters
Coral Wilding, a fictional character of Family Affairs
Jason Wilding, a fictional character of Family Affairs
Matt Wilding

Other
Wilding series, postage stamps
"Wilding", a term for some invasive species
Wilding conifer, invasive tree species
"WiLDing", WirelessLanDriving (see wardriving)
A term coined during the Central Park jogger case to describe gang assaults on strangers

See also
Rewilding (disambiguation)
Wildings, a department store in Wales